Intangible cultural heritage are elements of the cultural heritage of Georgia which are abstract and must be learned, encompassing traditional knowledge including festivals, music, performances, celebrations, handicrafts, and oral traditions.

Starting from 2011, 50 items were inscribed on the registry of Georgia's Intangible Cultural Heritage as of March 2020. Four of them have been placed on the UNESCO Intangible Cultural Heritage Lists.

Registry of Intangible Cultural Heritage of Georgia

References 

Cultural heritage of Georgia (country)
2011 establishments in Georgia (country)
Georgia
Lists of Intangible Cultural Heritage of Humanity